3,4-Methylenedioxyphenethylamine, also known as 3,4-MDPEA, MDPEA, and homopiperonylamine, is a substituted phenethylamine formed by adding a methylenedioxy group to phenethylamine. It is structurally similar to MDA,  but without the methyl group at the alpha position.

According to Alexander Shulgin in his book PiHKAL, MDPEA appears to be biologically inactive.  This is likely because of extensive first-pass metabolism by the enzyme monoamine oxidase. However, if MDPEA were either used in high enough of doses (e.g., 1-2 grams), or in combination with a monoamine oxidase inhibitor (MAOI), it is probable that it would become sufficiently active, though it would likely have a relatively short duration of action. This idea is similar in concept to the use of selective MAOA inhibitors and selective MAOB inhibitors in augmentation of dimethyltryptamine (DMT) and phenethylamine (PEA), respectively.

See also 
 Substituted methylenedioxyphenethylamine

References

External links 
 PiHKAL: #115 MDPEA; 3,4-Methylenedioxyphenethylamine; Homopiperonylamine

Psychedelic phenethylamines
Benzodioxoles